The Burlington and Missouri River Railroad (B&MR) or sometimes (B&M) was an American railroad company incorporated in Iowa in 1852, with headquarters in Omaha, Nebraska.  It was developed to build a railroad across the state of Iowa and began operations in 1856.  It was acquired by the Chicago, Burlington and Quincy Railroad in 1872, and kept serving as its subsidiary.

History

The Burlington and Missouri River Railroad was incorporated in Burlington, Iowa in 1852. It commenced operations on January 1, 1856 with only a few miles of track. In 1857 it connected to Ottumwa, followed by Murray in 1868. It finally reached the Missouri River in November 1859. It used wood-burning locomotives and wooden passenger cars.

After the Chicago, Burlington and Quincy Railroad (CB&Q) finished a bridge crossing the Mississippi River at Burlington, it connected to the Burlington and Missouri River Railroad. By 1868 the Burlington and Missouri River Railroad operated 13 locomotives and 429 cars, mostly freight, with net earnings of $299,850 in 1867. After the interest on loans, this meant a total net profit of $6,749.

A sub-branch of the railroad was founded in Nebraska in 1869, with rails first entering the state in 1870 via Plattsmouth. That summer, the railroad reached Lincoln, the recently designated state capital. It later continued to lay rails westward and eventually joining with the Union Pacific Railroad on September 3, 1872 at Kearney; this had the effect of linking traffic from southern Nebraska to the rest of the continent. That same year it began advertising "millions of acres of cheap land" as an incentive to prospective settlers to Iowa and Nebraska.

The Burlington and Missouri River Railroad was acquired by the Chicago, Burlington and Quincy Railroad in 1872. At the time, it had begun laying tracks to Denver, Colorado; this line was finished by the CB&Q ten years later.

After being acquired by the Chicago, Burlington and Quincy Railroad, the Burlington and Missouri River Railroad served as its subsidiary, operating several lines in the Black Hills, including those acquired when Chicago, Burlington and Quincy Railroad took over the Black Hills and Fort Pierre Railroad in 1901.

See also

 Railroads in Omaha

References

Further reading

 
 

Predecessors of the Chicago, Burlington and Quincy Railroad
Defunct Iowa railroads
Defunct companies based in Omaha, Nebraska
Rail lines receiving land grants
Railway companies established in 1852
Railway companies disestablished in 1875
1852 establishments in Iowa
American companies disestablished in 1875
American companies established in 1852